István Talabos (1 June 1956 – 20 October 2018) was a Hungarian sports shooter. He competed at the 1976 Summer Olympics and the 1980 Summer Olympics.

References

External links
 

1956 births
2018 deaths
Hungarian male sport shooters
Olympic shooters of Hungary
Shooters at the 1976 Summer Olympics
Shooters at the 1980 Summer Olympics
Sportspeople from Pest County
20th-century Hungarian people